The twenty-third season of the Case Closed anime was directed by Yasuichiro Yamamoto and produced by TMS Entertainment and Yomiuri Telecasting Corporation. The series is based on Gosho Aoyama's Case Closed manga series. In Japan, the series is titled  but was changed due to legal issues with the title Detective Conan. The series focuses on the adventures of teenage detective Shinichi Kudo who was turned into a child by a poison called APTX 4869, but continues working as a detective under the alias Conan Edogawa.

The episodes use five pieces of theme music: two openings and three endings. The first opening theme is "Q&A" by B'z used for episodes 716 and 717. The second opening theme is "Butterfly Core" by Valshe starting from episode 718. The third ending theme is "Rain Man" by Akihide starting from episode 737.  

The season began airing on November 23, 2013 through May 17, 2014 on Nippon Television Network System in Japan. The season was later collected and released in six DVD compilations by Shogakukan between March 27, 2015 and September 29, 2015, in Japan.  



Episode list

References
Notes
 The episodes were aired as a single hour-long episode in Japan

References

2013 Japanese television seasons
2014 Japanese television seasons
Season23